Hanan Ibrahim MBE is a Somali social activist. She is the Chairperson of the Barnet Muslim Women's Network, among other organizations.

Early years
Ibrahim grew up in Somalia. She is a mother of three children and a Muslim. After the outbreak of the civil war in her native country, she moved to the United Kingdom in 1998.

Career

In a professional capacity, Ibrahim worked with the Women Interfaith Network, Sisters against Violent Extremism, the African SANG and the Women's Federation for World Peace.

While in London, she founded the Somali Family Support Group (SFSG), a non-governmental organization catering to the UK's Somali and larger Horn African community. The SFSG promotes inter-faith dialogue and understanding, and advocates for greater female participation in various issues. It also offers a variety of social services, including a family advice center, health awareness drives, job-search assistance and skill acquisition workshops.

She serves as the Chairperson for the Barnet Muslim Women's Network. In 2008, she became a member of the SAVE UK Advisory Board, a Women Without Borders initiative. Ibrahim is also part of various other organizations and panels. The latter include the governmental National Muslim Women Advisory Group and the National Community Forum, a consultative body for the Department of Communities.

Based on her knowledge and experience in law, Ibrahim was also in 2011 appointed by the Transitional Federal Government (TFG) of Somalia to the Committee of Experts (CoE) tasked with preparing the country's new draft constitution.

Awards
For her contributions to society, Ibrahim was presented in 2004 with the Queen's Award for Voluntary Service. She received the Ambassador For Peace Award in 2009.

In 2010, she won the London Borough of Barnet Civic Award and the Community Engagement Award from HAYA - Somali Organization in London. That year, she was made a Member of the Order of the British Empire (MBE) for her community work with the SFSG.

References

External links
SAVE UK Advisory Board - Hanan Ibrahim

People from the London Borough of Barnet
Living people
Ethnic Somali people
Members of the Order of the British Empire
Somalian activists
Somalian women activists
Somalian expatriates in the United Kingdom
Place of birth missing (living people)
Year of birth missing (living people)
Date of birth missing (living people)
21st-century Somalian women politicians
21st-century Somalian politicians